Rockabye is a 1932 American pre-Code drama film starring Constance Bennett,  Joel McCrea, and Paul Lukas. The final version was directed by George Cukor after studio executives decided that the original film as directed by George Fitzmaurice was unreleasable. The screenplay by Jane Murfin is based on an unpublished play written by Lucia Bronder, based on her original short story.

Plot
When stage actress Judy Carroll testifies on behalf of her former lover, accused embezzler Al Howard, she loses custody of Elizabeth, an orphan she had planned to adopt. Her devoted manager Antonie "Tony" de Sola urges her to travel to Europe with her alcoholic mother Snooks to alleviate her emotional pain. While there she reads a play titled Rockabye, whose plot eerily resembles recent events in her life. Despite Tony's qualms, she is determined to star in a Broadway production.

Playwright Jacob Van Riker Pell is certain the sophisticated Judy will be unable to portray his heroine, a tough girl from Second Avenue, until she confesses that she was raised there herself. The two hit it off, and Judy convinces Tony to produce the play. On the verge of divorce, Jake proposes he and Judy wed as soon as he is free.

Jake fails to appear at the opening night party for Rockabye. His mother tells Judy that her daughter-in-law has just had a baby; she asks Judy to forget her son. When Jake finally arrives and assures her he still wants to marry her, Judy insists he return to his wife and newborn child. Devastated, she is comforted by Tony, who finally reveals his feelings for her.

Cast
 Constance Bennett as Judy Carroll 
 Joel McCrea as Jacob Van Riker Pell 
 Paul Lukas as Tony de Sola 
 Walter Pidgeon as Al Howard 
 Jobyna Howland as Snooks Carroll
 Clara Blandick as Brida
 Walter Catlett as Jimmy Dunn
 Virginia Hammond as Mrs. Van Riker Pell
 J. M. Kerrigan as Fagin
 June Filmer as Elizabeth
 Veda Buckland as Mrs. Evans (uncredited)
 Richard Carle as Doc (uncredited)
 Lita Chevret as Party Guest (uncredited)
 Charles Dow Clark as Mr. Farley (uncredited)
 Sterling Holloway as Speakeasy Patron (uncredited)
 Virginia Howell as Mrs. Bronson (uncredited)
 Edgar Kennedy as Water Wagon-Driver (uncredited)
 Charles Middleton as District Attorney (uncredited)
 Bert Moorhouse as Speakeasy Patron (uncredited)
 Edwin Stanley as Defense Attorney (uncredited)
 Max Wagner as Reporter (uncredited)

Production
RKO purchased the rights to the play from Gloria Swanson and hired George Fitzmaurice to direct the film adaptation. Anxious to accommodate exhibitors who were awaiting a new Constance Bennett film, the studio rushed the script into production with Phillips Holmes as the male lead. When the completed film was shown to executives, they declared it unreleasable and called in George Cukor to salvage it. The new director replaced Holmes with Joel McCrea and Laura Hope Crews, in the role of Judy's mother, with Jobyna Howland, reshot all their characters' scenes, and re-edited the balance of the film.

Reception
The New York Times observed, "There are tears enough in Rockabye to drown a plot, a circumstance which is a form of mercy in the case of this particular plot . . . As for the performance of Miss Bennett, a conservative opinion would be that she is a better actress than Rockabye makes her seem . . . Joel McCrea as the young playwright is better than the lines he has to recite."

Although the reviews were poor, “Rockabye performed well at the box office, actually grossing slightly more than What Price Hollywood? (a “runaway box office hit”) in its first weeks of distribution, according to RKO records.”

References

External links

 Rockabye at TCM
 
 
 

1932 films
1932 romantic drama films
American black-and-white films
American romantic drama films
1930s English-language films
Films about actors
Films about adoption
American films based on plays
Films directed by George Cukor
Films produced by David O. Selznick
Films set in New York City
Films with screenplays by Jane Murfin
1930s American films